Mona Juul (born 20 September 1967) is a Danish politician, who is a member of the Folketing for the Conservative People's Party. She was born in Aarhus and was elected into parliament in the 2019 Danish general election.

Political career
Juul was elected into parliament in the 2019 election, where she received 3,846 votes.

External links 
 Biography on the website of the Danish Parliament (Folketinget)

References 

Living people
1967 births
People from Aarhus
21st-century Danish women politicians
Women members of the Folketing
Conservative People's Party (Denmark) politicians
Members of the Folketing 2019–2022
Members of the Folketing 2022–2026